"Between You & I " is a song by Australian singer-songwriter Kita Alexander, released on 10 May 2019 via Warner Music Australia. The song is built around a sample of "Everybody Wants to Rule the World" by Tears for Fears.

Speaking on the release of the song, Alexander said she wrote the song "a couple of years ago" and explained that the song is "a hopeful anthem in the face of adversity. I wanted people who feel defeated in love and wounded by the great divide it causes to know that love will always be stronger if you can persist and make it through."

The song was certified gold in Australia in 2020.

Critical reception
The Music Network called the song an "indie pop jam".

Credits and personnel
Credits adapted from Spotify.

 Kita Alexander – vocals, writing
 Bnann – writing
 Jonny Harris – writing
 Ghostwriter – production

Certifications

References

2019 singles
2019 songs
Kita Alexander songs
Songs written by Kita Alexander
Warner Music Australasia singles